Listed below are executive orders, presidential proclamations and presidential review memorandums signed by United States President Jimmy Carter. His executive actions are also listed on WikiSource.



Executive orders

1977

1978

1979

1980

1981

See also
 List of executive actions by Gerald Ford, EO #11798–11966 (1974–1977)
 List of executive actions by Ronald Reagan, EO #12287–12667 (1981–1989)

References

External links

 
United States federal policy
Executive orders of Jimmy Carter
Jimmy Carter-related lists